Olexander Yarovyi from the Delft University of Technology, Delft, The Netherlands was named Fellow of the Institute of Electrical and Electronics Engineers (IEEE) in 2015 for leadership in ultra-wideband imaging for ground penetrating radar and microwave scanners.

References

Fellow Members of the IEEE
Living people
Year of birth missing (living people)
Place of birth missing (living people)
Academic staff of the Delft University of Technology